The Wisconsin Power and Light Berlin Power Plant is located in Berlin, Wisconsin.

History
Built in 1925 by Wisconsin Power & Light, the power plant is located on the bank of the Fox River. It was added to the State and the National Register of Historic Places in 1992.

References

Industrial buildings and structures on the National Register of Historic Places in Wisconsin
National Register of Historic Places in Green Lake County, Wisconsin
Power stations in Wisconsin
Commercial Style architecture in the United States
Brick buildings and structures
Industrial buildings completed in 1925
Alliant Energy